Wila Uqharani (Aymara , purely colored,  suffixes,  also spelled Vilaucarane) is a mountain in the north of the Barroso mountain range in the Andes of southern Peru, about  high. It is situated in the Tacna Region, Tarata Province, Tarata District. It lies southeast of Inka Apachita.

References

Mountains of Peru
Mountains of Tacna Region